Alex Taylor (born c. 1990 in Invercargill, Southland, New Zealand) is a New Zealand rugby union player who plays for Stirling County as a Number Eight.

Rugby Union career

Amateur career

Having started his rugby at Southland Boys' High School, Taylor moved on to senior club play for Woodlands Rugby Club. He was part of 4 Galbraith Shield wins which included a 3 peat. Having moved to Spain for a short term contract with top club VRAC in Valladolid. Taylor has since moved to Scotland, where now plays for Stirling County.

Professional career

Taylor played provincial rugby in New Zealand before moving to Scotland. He played for Southland alongside John Hardie. He also played 7s for Southland where he competed in two national tournaments. In 2015, he left New Zealand to go to Scotland.

Taylor played for Glasgow Warriors against Canada 'A' on 30 August 2016.

International career

He has represented New Zealand at schoolboy and age grade level teams. He was a trialist of the New Zealand Under 20 team ahead of the 2011 World Cup in Argentina. f

References

External links 
ESPN Profile
Alex Tayloe Youtube Highlights
Southland profile
Headshot image
Rugby image

Living people
1990s births
New Zealand rugby union players
Glasgow Warriors players
Stirling County RFC players
Southland rugby union players
Expatriate rugby union players in Scotland
New Zealand expatriate sportspeople in Scotland
Rugby union number eights
Rugby union players from Otago